North Thompson Oxbows Jensen Island Provincial Park is a provincial park in Thompson-Nicola Regional District in the Interior region of British Columbia, Canada, about  north of Kamloops at the community of Heffley Creek. It protects the riparian habitat of a single, seasonal oxbow on the right bank of the North Thompson River. There are no camping or day-use facilities.

The park is named in part for Kamloops lawyer Peter Jensen. Jensen and his wife lived on the island created by the oxbow since their marriage in 1968. Jensen died in 2011.

References

External links

Provincial parks of British Columbia
Thompson Country
1996 establishments in British Columbia
Protected areas established in 1996